Soyuz TMA-13 (Union TMA-13) was a Soyuz mission to the International Space Station (ISS). The spacecraft was launched by a Soyuz-FG rocket at 07:01 GMT on 12 October 2008. It undocked at 02:55 GMT on 8 April 2009, performed a deorbit burn at 06:24, and landed at 07:16. By some counts, Soyuz TMA-13 is the 100th Soyuz spacecraft to be crewed.

Crew

Backup crew

Crew notes
 Richard Garriott flew on TMA-13 as a guest of the Russian government through a spaceflight participant program run by Space Adventures. His role aboard the Soyuz is referred to as a Spaceflight Participant in English-language Russian Federal Space Agency documents, and NASA documents and press briefings.
 Salizhan Sharipov had originally been assigned to command this Soyuz flight and participate in Expedition 18, but was replaced by Yury Lonchakov.

References 

Crewed Soyuz missions
Spacecraft launched in 2008
Orbital space tourism missions
Spacecraft which reentered in 2009
Spacecraft launched by Soyuz-FG rockets